David Wall (born 1 January 1983) is an Australian racing driver competing in the Porsche Carrera Cup Australia Championship. He currently drives the No. 38 Porsche 911 GT3 Cup for Wall Racing.

Biography
As the son of long-time Sports Sedan racer and 2009 Kerrick Sports Sedan Series winner Des Wall, he started in sedan cars rather the conventional formula cars.

His mainstay has been sports car racing, particularly Porsches. He has won the Australian GT Championship twice in 2009 and 2010 driving a Porsche 911 GT3 Cup S Type 997 as well as competed in the Australian Carrera Cup Championship. He has also won the Australian Tourist Trophy in 2009 and 2010.

He has also competed in Production Cars finishing third in Class A of the Bathurst 12 Hour race in 2008.

In 2009, he followed his father into V8 Supercars competing in the long-distance races and in 2011 doing a full season in the Fujitsu V8 Supercar Series. His first preference was to join the series full-time in 2012 and this was accommodated by Brad Jones Racing by signing Wall for the full 2012 season with backing from Wilson Security.

Wall contested the 2014 V8 Supercars Championship in a Dick Johnson Racing entered Ford Falcon (FG). In 2015 Wall joined Garry Rogers Motorsport, replacing Robert Dahlgren. It marked Wall's third team in four seasons of V8 Supercars racing.

In 2016, he drove for GRM as a co-driver alongside Scott McLaughlin in the Pirtek Enduro Cup, before moving to Nissan Motorsport to co-drive with Rick Kelly in the No. 15 Nissan Altima.

Career results

Supercars Championship results

Complete Bathurst 1000 results

References

External links 
 V8 Supercars Official Profile
 Driver Database stats
 Profile on Racing Reference

1983 births
Living people
Australian racing drivers
Supercars Championship drivers
Garry Rogers Motorsport drivers
Nismo drivers
Kelly Racing drivers
Dick Johnson Racing drivers
Lamborghini Squadra Corse drivers